Lai Sun is a football team which played in Hong Kong First Division League from 1988 to 1991. In 1988, the team borrowed the HKFA membership from Double Flower and entered the league by the name of Lai Sun Double Flower. In the following season, it bought in the HKFA membership from Po Chai Pills and played under the name Lai Sun. The team quit the league in 1991 and returned the membership to Po Chai Pills.

Trophies
 1988–89: Hong Kong Viceroy Cup Winner, Hong Kong FA Cup Winner as Lai Sun Double Flower FA
 1989–90: Hong Kong Viceroy Cup Winner 
 1990–91: Hong Kong Senior Shield 1st Runner-up, Hong Kong Viceroy Cup 1st Runner-up, Hong Kong FA Cup 1st Runner-up

References
 香港足球總會九十週年紀念特刊

Defunct football clubs in Hong Kong
Lai Sun Group